Jesús Fernando Martínez Álvarez (born October 10, 1988) is a Dominican former professional baseball outfielder. Martínez signed with the New York Mets in 2005, and made his Major League Baseball (MLB) debut in 2009. He also played in MLB for the Houston Astros. He bats left-handed and throws right-handed.  He was one of 14 players suspended for taking part in the Biogenesis baseball scandal. He played for Team Spain in the 2019 European Baseball Championship. He then played for the team at the Africa/Europe 2020 Olympic Qualification tournament, in Italy in September 2019.

Career

New York Mets
Martínez signed with the Mets in July 2005 as an international free agent, when he was 16 years old. Mets general manager Omar Minaya, known for his ability to attract Latin American talent to the Mets, lured Martínez with a signing bonus of $1.4 million. Minaya said of the signing "What we saw in [Martinez] was a 16-year-old kid with power, great ability and great character, above everything else.”

Martínez had played center field in the minor leagues since the 2007 season with Double-A Binghamton. He was selected to both the 2007 and 2008 All-Star Futures Games. Martínez was considered by many to be a potential 5-tool player at the major league level.

Baseball America named him as the Mets Number One Prospect for 2007 and 2008.

Martinez then saw his status as a blue chip prospect decline over the next few years, due in large part to his frequent stints on the disabled list.  For example, Martinez was ranked as the Number 1 prospect in the Mets' organization by Scout.com in 2009 and 2010.  In 2011, he was dropped to Number 4.  Similarly, ESPN Scout Keith Law ranked Martinez as the Number 10 overall prospect in 2008, and then as the Number 16 overall prospect in 2009, but dropped him to Number 73 overall in 2010.  Due to his accumulated time on the major league roster, Martinez' prospect status expired after 2010.

After batting .291 with 8 home runs and leading the International League with 25 extra-base hits in 42 games with AAA Buffalo, Martínez was called up to the major leagues on May 26 as José Reyes and Ryan Church were placed on the disabled list. He went 0–3 with 2 strikeouts, a fielder's choice, a hit by pitch, and an RBI. He hit his first career home run against the Brewers on June 30 in a 6–3 loss.

After appearing in 11 games for the Mets in the majors and batting just .227 with an On Base Percentage of .261. The Mets waived Martinez on January 9, 2012 after years of injuries and disappointing progress.

Houston Astros
On January 11, 2012, Martinez was claimed off waivers by the Houston Astros. He was designated for assignment on May 6, 2013.

In 2012 Martinez played well for the Astros AAA team with a slash line of .314 / .367 / .507. However, Martinez struggled to perform in the Majors. The next year Martinez struggled in both the minors and majors for Houston.

New York Yankees
On June 18, 2013, Martínez was traded from the Astros to the New York Yankees for minor league pitcher Charles Basford.

On August 5, 2013, Martinez was suspended 50 games by the MLB for violating its drug policy and connection to Biogenesis.

References

External links

Scout.com – Fernando Martinez profile
MLB.com – Future Mets outfielders show promise: Prospect Martinez displays extraordinary power at young age

1988 births
Living people
Binghamton Mets players
Buffalo Bisons (minor league) players
Dominican Republic expatriate baseball players in Mexico
Dominican Republic expatriate baseball players in the United States
Dominican Republic sportspeople in doping cases
Gulf Coast Mets players
Hagerstown Suns players
Houston Astros players

Leones del Escogido players
Major League Baseball outfielders
Major League Baseball players from the Dominican Republic
Major League Baseball players suspended for drug offenses
Mesa Solar Sox players
Mexican League baseball left fielders
New York Mets players
Oklahoma City RedHawks players
Rojos del Águila de Veracruz players
Scranton/Wilkes-Barre RailRiders players
St. Lucie Mets players
2019 European Baseball Championship players